Capture of Roxburgh may refer to:

 Capture of Roxburgh (1314)
 Capture of Roxburgh (1460)